Friedrich Wilhelm Rembert Graf von Berg (tr.) was a Baltic German nobleman, statesman, diplomat and general who served in the Imperial Russian Army. Berg was a count of the Austrian Empire and Grand Duchy of Finland and the 5th last man to be promoted General-Field Marshal in the history of the Russian Empire. He served as the Governor-General of Finland from 1854 to 1861 and the last Viceroy of the Kingdom of Poland from 1863 to 1874.

Berg was most notable for his role as the viceroy of Finland and Poland. He gained a reputation for his role in defending Finland and Estonia from Anglo-French invasion during the Crimean War and was also crucial in suppressing and crushing the Polish January Uprising of 1863, during which rebel forces carried out numerous failed assassination attempts on him, martial law was consequently declared in Poland. Berg also held responsible for improving the economy and industry of Finland and Poland  during his time as viceroy. As a German, Berg was never keen of the Russification policies introduced in Poland, being opposed to the Pan-Slavism ideology of the Russians and keen towards the foreign policies of Germany. Outside of his military career, Berg was also a topographer and geodesist, being one of the founding members of the Russian Geographical Society. He died in St. Petersburg in 1874 and was buried in his family estate in Korten, Livonia (in now Pilskalns, Latvia).

Biography

Origin

Friedrich Wilhelm Rembert von Berg was born on May 15, 1794 (26 according to the Julian calendar in use in Russia at the time), in the family estate in the small village of Sagnitz, in the Kreis Dorpat of the Governorate of Livonia. His father Friedrich Georg von Berg (1763–1811) was a state councillor and his mother Gertruda Wilhelmine von Ermes (1774–1844) was a young noblewoman, the younger Friedrich was the first cousin once removed of generals Gregor (1765–1838) and Burchard Magnus von Berg (1764–1838), both of whom served in the Russian Imperial Army during the course of the Napoleonic Wars. Genealogists still debate where the Livonian noble Berg family originated in, many speculated they originated in Westphalia. The first known ancestor of the family to appear in Livonia was Otto von Berg. His son, who was also named Otto, was a vassal of the Livonian Knighthood.

Friedrich belonged to the Sagnitz branch of the Luist line of the family. The Luist line was formed by Captain Gustav von Berg (1656–1715), and the further divided Sagnitz branch was formed by Friedrich's grandfather Major Gotthard Ernst von Berg (1714–1766).

Early life
Berg along with his siblings spent their childhood in the Sagnitz castle and were home educated by the young Friedrich Georg Wilhelm Struve. He was brought up as a Lutheran. After he finished his home education he studied in the Tartu Gymnasium in Dorpat. Originally not seeking a military career as a family tradition, Berg enrolled into the Philosophy faculty of Imperial University of Dorpat in 1810. But after Napoleon invaded of Russia in 1812, Berg dropped out from university and voluntarily entered the Russian Imperial Army. He entered the army as a Fahnenjunker and was enlisted into the 6th Libau Infantry Regiment which was stationed at the north-western part of Russia to defend against Napoleon. Berg's bravery during the war of 1812 rewarded him the rank of lieutenant from Alexander I personally. He was also appointed second to the quartermaster due to his high education and being multilingual among Russian soldiers at the time.

After Napoleon was pushed out of Russia, Berg was transferred to a partisan unit under the commands of Baron von Tettenborn and Pavel Kutuzov and took part in actions in Germany including the Battle of Leipzig.

Family
Berg was born the eldest son of a family with three siblings, including his younger brother Gustav "Astaf" Gotthard Karl von Berg, owner of the Alt-Ottenhof Manor. His other brother Alexander was a diplomat and consul in Naples and London. Count von Berg married late in his life. In 1839, after a long relationship with the Baroness de Sassè, he married a rich Milanese aristocrat Leopoldina Cicogna-Mozzoni (1786–1874), the widow of the Italian politician Alessandro Annoni, with whom he had no children. However, after his brother Gustav's death in 1861, Friedrich adopted his orphaned nephews and brought them under his care:

 Friedrich Georg Magnus Graf von Berg (1845–1938)
 Alexander Rembert Joachim Graf von Berg (1847–1893)
 Georg Erich Rembert Graf von Berg (1849–1920)
 Emilie Wilhelmine "Minni" Anna Marie Ulrike Pauline Gräfin von Berg (1852–1945)

Since his marriage was childless, his Austrian and Finnish comital titles were inherited by his nephews/adoptive children.

Honours and awards

Russian

 Order of St. Anna, 3rd class (1813)
 Order of St. Vladimir, 4th class with a bow (1813)
 Order of Saint Anna, 1st class with the Imperial Crown (1828, Imperial Crown in 1831)
 Order of St. George, 3rd class (25.6.181829)
 Order of St. Vladimir, 2nd class (1829)
 Order of Virtuti Militari, Commander's Cross for military distinction (1831)
 Order of the White Eagle (1833)
 Order of St. Alexander Nevsky (1838, diamonds signs in 1845)
 Order of St. Vladimir, 1st class (1848)
 Gold Sword for Bravery with diamonds and the inscription "For a campaign to Hungary in 1849" 
 Order of St. Andrew with swords and diamond signs (7.08.1855, diamond signs in 11.8.1861)

Foreign

:
  Pour le Mérite with the Golden Crown (1813, Golden Crown in 1864)
  Order of the Red Eagle, 1st class (1835)
  Order of the Black Eagle with diamond marks (1845, diamond marks in 1865)
:
  Order of the Netherlands Lion, Great Cross (1849)
 :
  Order of St. Stephen of Hungary, Nagykereszt (1849)
 :
  Order of the Seraphim with diamond marks (1859, diamonds marks on 17.8.1860)
 :
  Order of the Redeemer, Great Cross (1868)

Publications 
 Le feldmaréchal-comte Berg, namiestnik dans le royaume de Pologne. Notice biographique. Warsaw 1872 – Autobiography

Notes

Citations

Works cited

General sources 

 
 

|-

1794 births
1874 deaths
People from Otepää Parish
People from Kreis Dorpat
Baltic-German people
Counts of the Russian Empire
18th-century Finnish nobility
19th-century Finnish nobility
Governors of the Grand Duchy of Finland
Namestniks of the Kingdom of Poland
Members of the State Council (Russian Empire)
Founding members of the Russian Geographical Society
Russian people of the January Uprising
Russian people of the November Uprising
Recipients of the Order of St. George of the Third Degree
Recipients of the Order of the White Eagle (Russia)
Recipients of the Order of St. Vladimir, 1st class
Recipients of the Order of St. Vladimir, 4th class
Recipients of the Order of St. Anna, 1st class
Recipients of the Order of St. Anna, 3rd class
Recipients of the Gold Sword for Bravery
Recipients of the Pour le Mérite (military class)
Grand Crosses of the Order of Saint Stephen of Hungary
Russian military personnel of the Napoleonic Wars